The ninespot chimaera (Hydrolagus barbouri) is a species of chimaera endemic to the waters off Japan and the South China Sea in the Northwest Pacific. Carnivorous in nature and with oviparous reproduction, its eggs are encased in horny shells.

References

External links
 

ninespot chimaera
fish of Japan
ninespot chimaera
marine fauna of East Asia
taxonomy articles created by Polbot